SRM University, Haryana (SRMH), also known as SRM University, Delhi-NCR, Sonepat, is a private university located at the Rajiv Gandhi Education City in Sonepat, Haryana, India. The university was established in 2013 by the SRM Institute of Science & Technology Trust (SRM IST Trust), Chennai through The Haryana Private Universities (Amendment) Act, 2013 which also established Shree Guru Gobind Singh Tricentenary University, Jagan Nath University, NCR, GD Goenka University and K.R. Mangalam University. The university is part of the SRM Educational Group which also includes the parent deemed university, SRM Institute of Science and Technology, headquartered in Chennai, and another private university, SRM University, Sikkim, among other institutes.

Campus
It includes separate hostels for boys and girls, a pharmacy, a stationery shop, a provisional outlet and a gym.

Departments
The university comprises the following departments:
 Biomedical Engineering
 Biotechnology & Biochemistry
 Chemistry
 Civil Engineering
 Commerce
 Computer Science & Engineering
 Electrical and Electronics Engineering
 Electronics and Communication Engineering
 English
 Environmental Sciences
 Hindi
 Law
 Management Studies
 Mathematics
 Mechanical Engineering
 Microbiology
 Physics
 Physical Education and Sports

Recognition and accreditation 
Like all private universities in India, SRM University, Haryana is recognized by the University Grants Commission (UGC) which has also an expert committee to the university. The university is also recognized by the Association of Indian Universities (AIU) and approved by the Bar Council of India (BCI).

References

External links

Sonipat
Universities in Haryana
Educational institutions established in 2013
2013 establishments in Haryana
Private universities in India